Snowboarding at the 2015 European Youth Olympic Winter Festival was held at the „Hochjoch“ ski area in Schruns , Austria from 27 to 29 January 2015.

Medal table

Boys events

Girls events

Mixed events

References 

2015 European Youth Olympic Winter Festival
2015 in snowboarding
2015